Hegg is a surname. Notable people with the surname include:

Eric A. Hegg (1867–1948), Swedish-American photographer
Jan Wessel Hegg (born 1938), Norwegian diplomat
Jon-Hermann Hegg (born 1999), Norwegian sport shooter
Steve Hegg (born 1963), American cyclist
Tom Hegg, American writer
Warren Hegg (born 1968), English cricketer

See also
Hegg, Wisconsin, unincorporated community
Heggs, a surname